Scopula colymbas is a moth of the family Geometridae. It was described by Claude Herbulot in 1994. It is found on Socotra, an island near the Arabian Sea, which is part of Yemen.

References

Moths described in 1994
colymbas
Endemic fauna of Socotra
Moths of Asia
Taxa named by Claude Herbulot